The following buildings were added to the National Register of Historic Places as part of the John F. Kennedy Space Center MPS Multiple Property Submission (or MPS). This is a partial list of historic places at KSC; full list available via KSC's Environmental Planning - Cultural Resources.

See also
 National Register of Historic Places listings in Brevard County, Florida

Notes

 Kennedy
National Register of Historic Places Multiple Property Submissions in Florida
Transportation buildings and structures on the National Register of Historic Places
Transportation buildings and structures on the National Register of Historic Places in Florida